The St. Lawrence Church is a religious building that serves as a parish church dependent on the Diocese of Cayenne (Dioecesis Caiennensis or Diocèse de Cayenne) which was created by pope Pius XII with the Bull "Qua sollicitudine" in 1956.

The temple follows the Roman or Latin rite, is located in the town of Saint-Laurent-du-Maroni, French Guiana. The church is listed as a historic monument by a legal provision of 16 August 1995.

It originated in the first chapel dedicated to St. Lawrence opened in 1958. The present church was renovated and reopened in 2006.

See also
Roman Catholicism in French Guiana

References

Roman Catholic churches in French Guiana
Buildings and structures in Saint-Laurent-du-Maroni